The Building at 548–606 Michigan Avenue is a historic building in Evanston, Illinois. The three-story brown brick building was built in 1924. Architect N. Hilton Smith designed the building, which incorporates elements of Gothic and Prairie School architecture. The building's design features geometric themes, projecting bays, terra cotta detailing, and a brick parapet. The building encircles a recessed courtyard with a wrought iron gate and multicolored stone paths.

The building was added to the National Register of Historic Places on March 15, 1984.

References

Buildings and structures on the National Register of Historic Places in Cook County, Illinois
Residential buildings on the National Register of Historic Places in Illinois
Buildings and structures in Evanston, Illinois
Apartment buildings in Illinois
Residential buildings completed in 1924